Camp Lincoln may refer to:
Camp Lincoln (Arizona Territory) or Camp on the Verde River, an outpost of Fort Whipple
Camp Lincoln (California), a United States military post in Crescent City, California
Camp Lincoln (Illinois), a United States military post in Springfield, Illinois that includes the Camp Lincoln Commissary Building
Camp Lincoln (Iowa), a United States military post in or near Keokuk, Iowa
Camp Lincoln (Kansas), a Union Army base near Leavenworth
Camp Lincoln (Massachusetts)
Camp Lincoln (New Hampshire)